Pico is a programming language developed at the Software Languages Lab at Vrije Universiteit Brussel. The language was created to introduce the essentials of programming to non-computer science students.

Pico can be seen as an effort to generate a palatable and enjoyable language for people who do not want to study hard for the elegance and power of a language. They have done it by adapting Scheme's semantics.

While designing Pico, the Software Languages Lab was inspired by the Abelson and Sussman's book "Structure and Interpretation of Computer Programs". Furthermore, they were influenced by the teaching of programming at high school or academic level.

Pico should be interpreted as 'small', the idea was to create a small language for educational purposes.

Language elements

Comments 
Comments are surrounded by backquotes ("`").

Variables 
Variables are dynamically typed; Pico uses static scope.
 var: value

Functions 
Functions are first-class objects in Pico. They can be assigned to variables. For example a function with two parameters param1 and param2 can be defined as:
 func(param1, param2): ...

Functions can be called with the following syntax:
 func(arg1, arg2)

Operators 
Operators can be used as prefix or infix in Pico:
 +(5, 2)
 5 + 2

Data types 
Pico has the following types: string, integer, real and tables.

It does not have a native char type, so users should resort to size 1 strings.

Tables are compound data structures that may contain any of the regular data types.

Boolean types are represented by functions (as in lambda calculus).

Control structures

Conditional evaluation 
Only the usual if statement is included
 if(condition, then, else)

Code snippets 
 display('Hello World', eoln)

 max(a, b):
  if(a < b, b, a)

 `http://www.paulgraham.com/accgen.html`
 foo(n): fun(i): n := n+i

Implementations

Mac OS, Mac OS X 
MacPico
XPico

Windows 
WinPico This version is buggy
WinPico stable

Linux 
TextPico for Linux

Cross-platform 
sPico for DrScheme

External links 

Software Languages Lab
Department of Computer Science at VUB
VUB
The Infogroep Pico page

Educational programming languages
Programming languages
1997 software
Programming languages created in 1997